A literary editor is an editor in a newspaper, magazine or similar publication who deals with aspects concerning literature and books, especially reviews. A literary editor may also help with editing books themselves, by providing services such as proof reading, copy-editing, and literary criticism.

Consulting editor
A consulting editor is a non-staff, independent literary editor. A consulting editor may be an independent, freelance editor, or a scholar providing expertise via consulting.

See also
 Developmental editor
 Book editor

References 

Writing occupations
Types of editors